Vladimir Polyakov (Russian: Владимир Евгеньевич Поляков; born 9 July 1952) is a Soviet rower. He competed at the 1972 Summer Olympics in Munich with the men's coxless pair where they came eighths.

References

1952 births
Living people
Soviet male rowers
Olympic rowers of the Soviet Union
Rowers at the 1972 Summer Olympics